Robert Tyszkiewicz (born 7 June 1963 in Białystok) is a Polish politician. He was elected to the Sejm on 25 September 2005, receiving 13,232 votes in 24 Białystok district as a candidate from the Civic Platform list.

See also
Members of Polish Sejm 2005-2007

References

External links
Robert Tyszkiewicz - parliamentary page - includes declarations of interest, voting record, and transcripts of speeches.

Civic Platform politicians
1963 births
Living people
People from Białystok
Members of the Polish Sejm 2005–2007
Members of the Polish Sejm 2007–2011
Members of the Polish Sejm 2011–2015
Members of the Polish Sejm 2015–2019
Members of the Polish Sejm 2019–2023